Chiang Kham is a district (amphoe) in the northeastern part of Phayao province, northern Thailand.

Geography
Neighboring districts are (from the south clockwise): Pong, Chun of Phayao Province; Thoeng of Chiang Rai province; and Phu Sang of Phayao Province. To the northeast is Xaignabouli province of Laos.

Administration

Central administration 
Chiang Kham district is divided into 10 sub-districts (tambons), which are further subdivided into 135 administrative villages (mubans).

Local administration 
There are four sub-district municipalities (thesaban tambons) in the district:
 Chiang Kham consisting of parts of sub-district Yuan.
 Wiang consisting of sub-district Wiang.
 Fai Kwang consisting of sub-district Fai Kwang.
 Yuan consisting of parts of sub-district Yuan.

There are seven sub-district administrative organizations (SAO) in the district:
 Nam Waen consisting of sub-district Nam Waen.
 Chedi Kham consisting of sub-district Chedi Kham.
 Rom Yen consisting of sub-district Rom Yen.
 Chiang Ban consisting of sub-district Chiang Ban.
 Mae Lao consisting of sub-district Mae Lao.
 Ang Thong consisting of sub-district Ang Thong.
 Thung Pha Suk consisting of sub-district Thung Pha Suk.

References

External links
amphoe.com (Thai)

Chiang Kham